BWC may stand for:

 Babcock & Wilcox, a U.S. based power generation company
 Bahá'í World Centre
 Baldwin-Wallace College, now Baldwin Wallace University in Berea, Ohio
 Backward compatibility
 Baseball World Cup
 Beauty Without Cruelty, British cosmetics company
 Big West Conference, an NCAA-affiliated Division I athletic conference
 Biological Weapons Convention, a 1975 international treaty prohibiting biological weapons
 Body-Worn Camera, a technology often used in policing for evidence collection and improved transparency
 Ohio Bureau of Workers' Compensation, a government agency